RFA Dewdale (A151) was a Dale-class fleet tanker  and landing ship (gantry) of the Royal Fleet Auxiliary.

Taken over by the Admiralty and completed as a Landing Ship Gantry carrying 15 LCMs with accommodation for 150 military personnel. Her landing craft were in the first assault waves during the North African landings in 1943. Credited with shooting down two Ju 88s at Bougie, she was later damaged by bombing at Algiers and returned to UK for repairs in October 1944. Later in the war she served in the eastern Mediterranean and with the Eastern Fleet during the Malaya Landings.

Reconverted to a tanker at Portsmouth by March 1947, she resumed freighting duties before being sold to Netransmar Cie. SA for scrap in 1959.

References 

 
 

Dale-class oilers
Ships built on the River Mersey
Tankers of the Royal Fleet Auxiliary
1941 ships